John Bolles may refer to:

John A. Bolles (1809–1878), Massachusetts Secretary of the Commonwealth
John Savage Bolles (1905–1983), American architect
Sir John Bolles, 1st Baronet (c. 1580–1648), of the Bolles baronets
Sir John Bolles, 3rd Baronet (1641–1686), of the Bolles baronets
Sir John Bolles, 4th Baronet (1669–1714), MP for Lincoln

See also
Bolles (disambiguation)